The International Clinical Research Centre at St. Anne’s University Hospital in Brno (FNUSA-ICRC) is a next-generation research and development center that focuses on finding new methods, technologies and medicines used to prevent, diagnose and treat cardiovascular and neurological diseases and disorders such as heart failure, coronary syndromes, hypertension, cardiac arrhythmia, sleep apnea, stroke, dementia and Alzheimer’s disease. Such diseases are among the leading diseases and causes of death in modern society.

Based in Brno, Czech Republic, the Centre continuously builds on its successful collaboration with a number of foreign (such as Mayo Clinic, University College London, The University of Minnesota) and Czech (such as the Czech Academy of Sciences, Masaryk University, Brno University of Technology) academic institutions and industrial companies. It currently has more than 400 employees, including approximately 350 experts working in 31 research teams. The Centre is an integral part of St. Anne’s University Hospital in Brno (FNUSA).

History 

2001	First contact with Mayo Clinic

2002	The initial concept of FNUSA-ICRC

2006	The Government of the Czech Republic adopts a resolution to build FNUSA-ICRC (Resolution No. 239 of 8 March 2006)

2009	Application for a grant under the EU Structural Funds – OP RDI

2009	Application for a subsidy from the budget of the Ministry of Health

2010	Start of construction of buildings B1 and C1 for FNUSA-ICRC and clinic 3 of the University Hospital

2011	Decision to award an OP RDI grant to build FNUSA-ICRC

2011	Start of construction of FNUSA-ICRC, start of research

2012	Start of operation of buildings B1 and C2 for FNUSA-ICRC and clinic 3 of the University hospital

2012	International selection procedure for the FNUSA-ICRC Chair

2013	New FNUSA-ICRC management take up their duties. Gorazd B. Stokin, M.D., MSc., Ph.D becomes the new head of FNUSA-ICRC. The world-renowned Slovenian neurologist won the selection procedure based on a recommendation from an independent international Search Committee

2014	Evaluation of FNUSA-ICRC by an international evaluation panel of the Ministry of Education, Youth and Sports

2014	Evaluation of FNUSA-ICRC’s research activities and results by the International Science Board

2015	Restructuring of research teams

2015	FNUSA-ICRC obtains its first patent: a joint patent with Masaryk University for a substance with potential use as a prostate cancer drug

2015	Application for financing under the National Sustainability Program

2015	A grant of CZK 1 billion is awarded by the National Sustainability Program

2015	Completion of the OP RDI phase – 100% of the RDI project’s objectives accomplished

2016	Start of financing under the National Sustainability Program

2016	A grant of CZK 177 million is awarded from the EU Structural Funds to map the molecular nature of ageing processes

2017	Prof. Damborský, one of the research team leaders, receives the Czech Head – Invention award / Kapsch Award for protein research

2018	A grant of CZK 700 million is awarded from the EU Structural Funds to research ageing

2018	FNUSA-ICRC obtains its second patent: a joint US patent with the Institute of Scientific Instruments of the Czech Academy of Sciences and M&I s.r.o. for a new diagnostic device – a high-frequency ECG for cardiology

Research 
The research conducted at FNUSA-ICRC is based on collaboration among experts within international multidisciplinary teams. FNUSA-ICRC has 30 research teams and 400 employees. Some of the researchers also work as physicians at St. Anne’s University Hospital in Brno, while others also work at the Faculty of Medicine or the Faculty of Science at Masaryk University.

Clinical research is primarily focused on the development of new technologies, methods, procedures and medicines enabling the effective prevention, early diagnosis and personalized treatment of selected diseases and disorders. Translational research ‘translates’ the basic mechanisms of disease development into clinical practice and vice versa. The focus of the basic research is to study the properties of stem cells and examine key processes for selective stem cell manipulation with the aim of developing their potential use in modern medicine. Core facilities include advanced laboratories for conducting experimental medicine and translational research.

Clinical research 

 Cardiology research
Acute coronary syndromes
Interventional cardiac electrophysiology
Sleep medicine
Neurology research
Stroke
Dementia
Oncology Research
Pediactric oncology translational research 
Laboratory oncology translational research
Multi-disciplinary research
Kardiovize Brno 2030
Research incubator
Cardiovascular magnetic resonance research
Nuclear cardiology and cardiac CT
Intensive care research

Translational research

 Cardiovascular system mechanobiology
Cellular and molecular immunoregulation
Epigenetics metabolism and aging
Translational neuroscience and aging program
Molecular control of cellular signaling

Basic research

 Medicinal chemistry
Protein engineering
Genome integrity
Cell and tissue regeneration
Cancer plasticity
Inflammation
Stem cells and disease modelling
Cell signaling

Core facilities

 Animal center
 Biostatistics
 Mass spectrometry
 Clinical pharmacology unit
 Clinical trials unit
 Cell and tissue engineering
Biomedical engineering research

Research infrastructure 
From 2011–2015, FNUSA-ICRC used EU and Czech grants to purchase approximately 1,200 new medical devices and pieces of equipment worth more than CZK 1.2 billion. In addition to helping to facilitate research, a significant proportion of the devices are also used for clinical practice, in accordance with the applicable legislation and the terms of the grants that were used to acquire those devices / equipment.

FNUSA-ICRC has participated and continues to participate in several national and European research networks, e.g. CZECRIN/ECRIN (national and European networks for academic clinical trials), ELIXIR (a network for exchanging data in life science), European Sleep Apnea Database, and EATRIS (a network for conducting research in translational medicine). The Centre is taking part in 14 international projects funded by the European Horizon 2020 program.

Research results 
Starting in mid-2011, FNUSA-ICRC’s research activities brought about e.g. the following results by the end of 2018:

Nearly 1,700 scientific publications, mostly in reputable international scientific journals

Two patents granted and three additional patent applications pending

7 registered designs and utility models for new medical devices and instruments registered with the Industrial Property Office of the Czech Republic

11 prototypes of new diagnostic devices

6 software programs for conducting research or clinical practice

15 international scientific awards such as the Young Investigator Award, Best Innovation Award, Danubius Young Scientist Award and Novartis Discovery Award

The Czech Head Kapsch Award for one of the research team leaders

An International team 
FNUSA-ICRC has attracted researchers and students from 35 countries who have come to Brno e.g. from Argentina, Brazil, Italy, Mexico, Germany, Portugal, Poland, Austria, Slovakia, Slovenia and the UK to build international research teams. To date, several international training projects for doctors, scientists, students and medical personnel have been implemented within the Centre. These include short-term and long-term study periods at prestigious foreign institutions and visits by foreign specialists to Brno, during which the participants share their experience and take part in research projects. Foreign students of medicine, biology and biomedical engineering programs come to Brno for study periods at FNUSA-ICRC.

Benefits of the Centre 
The establishment and existence of FNUSA-ICRC has brought the following benefits to society in Brno, the Czech Republic and throughout the world:

The construction of three new buildings has allowed St. Anne’s University Hospital to move several clinical departments into modern facilities.

Some of the diagnostic and therapeutic devices that have been purchased for research are also partially being used for clinical care (in accordance with national and European regulations).

Almost every employee of the Centre has had the opportunity to spend some time at foreign research institutions and bring new know-how and experience back to Brno.

Every year, FNUSA-ICRC is visited by dozens of foreign experts who share their knowledge with the Centre’s personnel and students of Brno-based universities, as well as personnel from other research centers.

Dozens of public lectures, seminars and workshops organized by the Centre are open to scientists and doctors from other research centers and hospitals, as well as to students.

FNUSA-ICRC researchers have contributed to the research and development activities of many industrial enterprises.

The patients of St. Anne’s University Hospital and several other collaborating hospitals have had the opportunity to participate in clinical trials of new drugs and medical devices that are not yet on the market.

In respect of cutting-edge technology, FNUSA-ICRC works with many leading academic research institutions and companies from all over the world, thus helping to build a positive image of Brno and the Czech Republic abroad.

Academic partners 
FNUSA-ICRC collaborates with a number of major foreign institutions such as Mayo Clinic (USA), The University of California San Diego (USA), Karolinska Institutet and Lund University (both Sweden), The University of Calgary (Canada), The University of South Florida (USA) and others. In addition, other major Czech institutions such as Masaryk University, Brno University of Technology, the University of Veterinary and Pharmaceutical Sciences in Brno, the Institute of Biophysics and the Institute of Scientific Instruments of the Czech Academy of Sciences also work closely with FNUSA-ICRC

The most important partnership thus far has been the collaboration with the Mayo Clinic (USA), whose employees were involved as early as the initial development of the FNUSA-ICRC concept in 2001–2006. Mayo Clinic specialists act as mentors to several FNUSA-ICRC research teams and, to-date, more than 170 joint articles have been published in foreign scientific journals, and 2 joint US patent applications have been filed.

Collaboration with industry 
Collaboration with industry – including, above all, pharmaceutical companies, contract research organizations and health technology manufacturers – takes several forms. FNUSA-ICRC conducts clinical investigations of new drugs and clinical trials of medical devices. It is a ‘Prime Site’ preferred partner to the US-based company IQVIA, the world’s largest intermediary of clinical investigations. In addition, FNUSA-ICRC conducts custom research for both large multinational companies and small local businesses. The volume of contract research continues to increase by almost 100% every year. FNUSA-ICRC also has joint research grants with industrial partners from the Czech Republic and abroad. Furthermore, the commercialization of the first results from FNUSA-ICRC research is being prepared.

Financing of the Centre 
Phase 1, 2011–2015:

St. Anne’s University Hospital received a grant from the EU Structural Funds, under the Operational Programme Research and Development for Innovation, in the amount of CZK 2.3 billion to build FNUSA-ICRC. This grant was supplemented by a subsidy from the national budget, the budget allocation of the Ministry of Health of the Czech Republic, for constructing buildings for FNUSA-ICRC, clinic 3 of the University Hospital, a medical library and other premises. In addition, the University Hospital also invested more than CZK 600 million of its own funds in the construction. In the 2011–2015 period, FNUSA-ICRC received additional grants for research, education, and international cooperation totaling CZK 910 million.

Phase 2, 2016-2020

In the 2016–2020 period, 57% of the cost of operating the Centre is being covered by the state budget of the Czech Republic, the budget allocation for the Ministry of Education of the Czech Republic, the National Sustainability Programme. In the previous phase, the European Union specified establishing this fund as a precondition to be awarded grants from the EU Structural Funds. The Centre must acquire the remaining 43% of the Centre’s operating and development costs from other sources. To date, more than 80 new grants and 30 projects from industrial partners have been obtained. Supplementary income amounting to at least 43% of the total budget has thus been successfully secured. St. Anne’s University Hospital covers remaining costs that cannot be covered by any grant sources, which amount to 1–2% per year. Some of the grants that have been obtained will run until 2022 or 2023 – a part of the funding for the post-2020 period has thus already been secured.

Clinical care 
FNUSA-ICRC strives to create a harmonious environment in which the patient-health professional relationship is based on a personalized approach, mutual trust and respect, while upholding ethical and moral principles and values. At the same time, international cooperation opens up opportunities to use the latest treatment methods.

External links
FNUSA-ICRC website

Medical research organizations
Year of establishment missing